Jovan Veselinov Žarko (20 January 1906 – 8 February 1982) was a Serbian communist politician. He served as President of Serbia, Prime Minister of Serbia and as a Chairman of the League of Communists of Serbia. He was a Partisan fighter in World War II, and was proclaimed People's Hero of Yugoslavia.

Controversy 
Famed economist and politician Edvard Kardelj was shot and wounded on a hunting trip in 1959 by Veselinov. Although the official police investigation concluded that Veselinov had been shooting at a wild boar and Kardelj was struck by a ricochet from a rock, it was suggested at the time that the assassination attempt was orchestrated by his political rival Aleksandar Ranković or Ranković's ally Slobodan Penezić.

References

Serbian politicians
Yugoslav politicians
Presidents of Serbia
Prime Ministers of Serbia
League of Communists of Serbia politicians
1906 births
1982 deaths
Recipients of the Order of the People's Hero